Richard Kimball (b. Washington, D.C., 1941), also known as Rick Kimball, is an American composer and pianist.

He was educated at the Juilliard School and received the Alexandre Gretchanninov Memorial Prize in Composition for his String Quartet.  He has worked with musicians such as Luciano Berio, and jazz arranger Hall Overton. He composed works for the Tree of Life musical event, held at the Lycian Centre in Sugarloaf, New York. He has taught on the faculties of The Juilliard School and Manhattan School of Music.
He currently lives in New York  He was formerly married to Cynthia Hoffmann, Voice Faculty Member of The Juilliard School, Manhattan School of Music, and The Curtis Institute of Music.

Music  
X-Tem-Por-E: Richard Kimball / Lloyd McNeill Primary Artist, Piano, Composer
The Art of Aging': Richard Kimball Primary Artist Composer Tree of Life Music Event:  Richard Kimball Primary Artist Composer

 Books Flute Music by Women Composers'',

References

21st-century American composers
Juilliard School alumni
1941 births
Living people